The Autozam Clef is a mid-size sedan that was sold by Autozam from 1992 until 1994.

It shared Mazda's GE platform with cars like the ɛ̃fini MS-6 and Mazda MX-6 coupe. The word "clef" is a musical notation, and Mazda chose it to signify that the Clef was meant to serve as a reference point by which other Autozam products would become to be known or regarded as. The Clef was mechanically related to the Mazda Cronos, but featured different bodywork, and rear side window designs. 
 
The Clef had the same width dimensions as the Mazda Cronos which shared the 2.5 L V6 engine. The width, length, and engine displacement dimensions have particular significance in Japan, due to dimension regulations, where Japanese consumers pay an additional annual tax for larger vehicles, and also had implications as to how much the annual road tax obligation will be.

As the Clef was the top level sedan at Autozam, which was introduced as a retailer of entry level products to Japanese consumers, the width dimension presented an issue in that buyers in Japan were liable for yearly taxes, and because the Clef was largely identical to other Mazda GE platform cars, Japanese buyers who were willing to pay extra taxes for a wide car from Mazda had many choices and the Clef wasn't usually the first choice.

Of all Autozam products sold at the time, only the Clef exceeded the width dimension stipulation; other Autozam products were either kei class vehicles or supermini products.

Clef
Front-wheel-drive vehicles
All-wheel-drive vehicles
Vehicles with four-wheel steering
Cars introduced in 1992